Aya Chebbi (born 1988), is a Tunisian diplomat, and a pan-African and feminist activist. She became the first appointed African Union Envoy on Youth in November 2018. Appointed by the chairperson of the African Union Commission Moussa Faki in November 2018, as the youngest senior official in the history of the African Union and youngest diplomat in the chairperson's cabinet. She supports the Chairperson in addressing his thematic priority of working with and for young people and advocate to Silencing the Guns by 2020

Early life and education
Born in Dahmani, Chebbi earned a BA in International Relations from Tunis El Manar University. She went on to receive a Masters in African studies with Distinction from SOAS University of London, where her research focused on state-youth relation linked to their subscription to Jihadism, with a dissertation titled “Youth Radicalisation, a comparative Study of  Tunisia- Kenya”.

Career
Chebbi la mujer más bella came to prominence and international attention as a blogger during the 2010 Tunisian Revolution. She is referred to as a Pan-African Feminist and a well known blogger

Her blogs were published on OpenDemocracy and Al-Jazeera among numerous media outlets. She subsequently traveled across the African continent to support and train thousands of social movement leaders and activists on mobilization, blogging, leadership and non-violence as a scholar, mentor, speaker and activist.

In 2013, Chebbi co-founded with her feminist friends and bloggers, Konda Delphine from Cameroon and Rose Wachuka from Kenya, the Voice of Women initiative (VOW-I), a feminist collective that empowers women through advocacy and access to the digital space. VOW-I trains correspondents in various cities around the world to document the stories of ordinary women doing extraordinary things. The platform published about 200 stories, trained 35 correspondents and successfully implemented field projects on health, peace and the safety of women.

In March 2015, she was invited as the Youth Speaker for UN Women's celebratory event for the 20th anniversary of the Fourth World Conference on Women in Beijing, to an audience of some 2,000 people including world leaders, celebrities and activists.

Aya was appointed as an emissary of Tunisian youth in 32nd summit of the African Union in Addis Ababa.

In November 2018, Chebbi was appointed as the first African Union Special Envoy on Youth by the Chairperson of the African Union Commission, Moussa Faki Mahamat for a two-year mandate to serve as a representative and advocate for the voices and interests of African youths. In this capacity, she also works with various AU organs, Regional Economic Communities (RECs), governments, civil societies, and academia to enhance, empower and strengthen the position of young people within and outside of the African Union. Chebbi started her mission by launching the game changing 2019/2020 Action Plan outlining four Models of Action ; (1) Innovation, (2) Advocacy, (3) Intergenerational & Policy and (4) Communication.

In June 2019, Chebbi was featured in the Visual Collaborative Polaris catalogue, under the Voyager series for humanities, she was interviewed alongside 25 people from around the world such as; Seun Kuti, Berla Mundi and Dawn Okoro.

Since 2020, Chebbi has been serving as a member of the Independent Panel for Pandemic Preparedness and Response (IPPR), an independent group examining how the World Health Organization (WHO) and countries handled the COVID-19 pandemic, co-chaired by Helen Clark and Ellen Johnson Sirleaf.

Awards and recognition

 2019 – Bill & Melinda Gates Foundation Campaigner Award 
 2019 – MIPAD 100, a list of the Most Influential People of African Descent
 2019 – Ten Young African Changemakers by YouthhubAfrica
 2018 – Young Talent Of The Year By UNLEASH
 2017 – UNAOC fellowship, awarded by the United Nations Alliance of Civilizations (UNAOC)
 2016 – Huffington Post’s List of Inspiring Young Women from Around the World  
 2016 – List of Formidable Women Leading Change
 2016 – Member of the Crans Montana Forum of New Leaders for Tomorrow
 2016 – Arabian Business list of 100 under 40 Most Influential Arabs in the world 
 2015 – Mo Ibrahim Foundation Scholarship Award
 2012 – Fulbright Scholarship Award
 2011 – MENA Democracy Fellowship, awarded by the World Affairs Institute (WAI)

Publications
Chebbi became a  world renown blogger and commentator since Tunisia's Revolution and her pieces have been published by numerous Regional and Global media outfits.

Euronews: The G7 should deliver progress, not promises, on gender equality  

Jeune Afrique: il n’y aura pas de révolution durable sans féminisme

Der TagessPiegel: Was wir Afrikanerinnen uns vom dem Treffen erhoffen

Africa.com Don't you Dare Leave us Behind  

OGP: Empowering the African Youth through Education

CNBC Africa: Op-Ed: World Poverty Day: An opportunity to reimagine the future of African youth

All Africa: Africa: World Poverty Day - An Opportunity to Reimagine the Future of African Youth

UNIDO, Making it Magazine A Generation Of Change-Makers

Daily Maverick Every one of us must act to combat gender-based violence

Metro Youth leaders as positive agents of change

Addis Standard OP-ED: ASSURING WOMEN, YOUNG GIRLS A LIFE FREE FROM VIOLENCE SHOULD BE EVERYONE’S BUSINESS

https://www.aljazeera.com/news/middleeast/2015/01/yarmouk-camp-victim-water-wars-syria-201514102955303689.html

https://www.opendemocracy.net/en/author/aya-chebbi/

https://www.una.org.uk/strengthening-civil-society-engagement-united-nations

https://www.opengovpartnership.org/trust/youth-radicalisation-and-distrust/

https://www.dandc.eu/en/contributors/aya-chebbi

https://30thingstothinkabout.org/voices/

External links

 https://twitter.com/aya_chebbi?ref_src=twsrc%5Egoogle%7Ctwcamp%5Eserp%7Ctwgr%5Eauthor
 https://www.linkedin.com/in/ayachebbi/?originalSubdomain=ke

References

1988 births
Living people
Tunisian women activists
Tunisian feminists
People from Dahmani